Chris Noakes (born 21 July 1985 in Auckland, New Zealand) is a professional rugby union player.

Career

ITM Cup
Noakes made his debut for Otago in 2007 and was a regular starter by the 2008 Air New Zealand Cup, where he scored 51 points for the province. His 2009 season was highlighted by a try in a Ranfurly Shield challenge against Wellington which Otago ultimately narrowly lost.
After missing most of the 2010 ITM Cup through injury, Noakes returned to start the final four matches of the season.
For the 2011 ITM Cup, Noakes moved to Bay of Plenty to replace the departing Mike Delany at first five-eighth.

Noakes missed the entire 2013 ITM Cup competition following a serious neck injury during the previous Super Rugby season.

Super Rugby
Noakes was signed by the Highlanders for the 2012 Super Rugby season. Initially expected to be a depth player, injuries to Colin Slade and Lima Sopoaga thrust him into a more prominent role, and he made 12 appearances including 7 starts, totalling 86 points in the process.

London Irish
On 1 May 2014, Noakes moved to England when he signed for London Irish to compete in the Aviva Premiership with a two-year contract from the 2014–15 season.

Karori Stonecutters
Noakes is expected to make his debut for gun t20 team, the Karori Stonecutters, on 14 February 2021.

References

External links
 Blues Profile
 BOP profile

1985 births
Living people
New Zealand rugby union players
Rugby union fly-halves
Bay of Plenty rugby union players
Otago rugby union players
Highlanders (rugby union) players
Blues (Super Rugby) players
Rugby union players from Auckland
London Irish players
New Zealand expatriate rugby union players
New Zealand expatriate sportspeople in England
Expatriate rugby union players in England